Eminencia were a Cuban baseball team that played in the Cuban Summer Championship in 1905. The club featured players mostly from the Cuban League and were managed by Alberto Azoy.

Notable players
Alfredo Arcaño
Bernardo Carrillo
Julián Castillo
Augusto Franqui
Gervasio Gonzalez
Rogelio Valdés

References

Defunct baseball teams in Cuba